Dieunomia is a genus of sweat bees in the family Halictidae. There are about nine described species in Dieunomia.

Species
These nine species belong to the genus Dieunomia:
 Dieunomia apacha (Cresson, 1868)
 Dieunomia boharti (Cross, 1958)
 Dieunomia bolliana (Cockerell, 1910)
 Dieunomia heteropoda (Say, 1824)
 Dieunomia mesillae Cockerell, 1899
 Dieunomia micheneri (Cross, 1958)
 Dieunomia nevadensis (Cresson, 1874) (Nevada nomia)
 Dieunomia triangulifera (Vachal, 1897)
 Dieunomia xerophila Cockerell, 1899

References

Further reading

External links

 

Halictidae
Articles created by Qbugbot